The Paru River is a northern tributary of the lower Amazon in Pará state in north-central Brazil.

The river flows through the Uatuma-Trombetas moist forests ecoregion.
Part of the river's basin is in the Maicuru Biological Reserve.

In popular culture

The seventh track of the album Aguas da Amazonia is named after the river.

See also
List of rivers of Pará

References
Brazilian Ministry of Transport

Rivers of Pará
Tributaries of the Amazon River